Kissed by the Wolves is a 1975 Hong Kong adult film directed by famous Shaw Brothers villain actor Chan Hung Lit, who also acts in a supporting role. It stars Alan Tang, Pan Yin Tze, Dean Shek and Lydia Shum. This film won "Best Cinematography" at the 21st Asia Pacific Film Festival.

Cast
 Alan Tang
 Pan Yin Tze
 Dean Shek
 Lydia Shum
 Chan Hung Lit
 Steve Chen Hao
 Tina Chin
 Fung Hak On
 Ouyang Sha-fei

References

External links
 Kissed by the Wolves at the Hong Kong Movie DataBase
 

1975 films
Hong Kong erotic films
1970s Mandarin-language films
1970s Hong Kong films